Ralf Scheepers (born 5 February 1965) is the vocalist for the German heavy metal band Primal Fear. He has a relatively high-pitched tenor-esque singing voice and sometimes uses a shriek reminiscent of Judas Priest's Rob Halford, although it is his baritone lows which give him a near four-octave range in the modal register. He has also sung in Gamma Ray and Tyran' Pace. Scheepers has also done guest vocals for the bands Avantasia, Scanner, Therion, Ayreon, and Shadow Gallery, and worked with Tom Galley on Phenomena's Blind Faith album. He currently provides instruction for all around singing, music, studio and recording/processing techniques at RS Vocal Works in Baltmannsweiler, Germany. Writer Paul Stenning has described him as "the greatest example of strength in metal."

Discography

Primal Fear

Primal Fear (1998)
Jaws of Death (1999)
Nuclear Fire (2001)
EP - Horrorscope (2002)
Black Sun (2002)
DVD - The History of Fear (2003)
Devil's Ground (2004)
Seven Seals (2005)
Metal Is Forever : The Very Best of Primal Fear (2006)
New Religion (2007)
16.6: Before the Devil Knows You're Dead (2009)
Live in the USA (2010)
DVD - 16.6 All over the World (2010)
Unbreakable (2012)
Delivering the Black (2014)
Rulebreaker (2016)
DVD - Angels of Mercy: Live in Germany (2017)
Best Of Fear (2017)
Apocalypse (2018)
Metal Commando (2020)
I Will Be Gone feat. Tarja Turunen (2021)

Tyran' Pace
 Eye to Eye (1983)
 Long Live Metal (1984)
 Watching You (1986)

Gamma Ray
 Heading for Tomorrow (1990)
 DVD/VHS/LASERDISC - Heading for the East (1990)
 Sigh No More (1991)
 Insanity and Genius (1993)
 DVD/VHS/LASERDISC - Lust for Live (1993)
 DVD/VHS/LASERDISC Power of Metal (1994)  live compilation together with Rage, Conception, and Helicon
 The Best (of) (2015)
 30 Years of Amazing Awesomeness (2021)
 DVD - 30 Years Live Anniversary (2021)

F.B.I.
Hell on Wheels (1993)

Solo
Scheepers (2011)

Blackwelder
Survival of the Fittest (2015)

Enzo and the Glory Ensemble
In the Name of the Father (2015)
In the Name of the Son (2017)
In the Name of the World Spirit (2020)

Michael Schenker Group
’’Immortal’’. Scheepers as a guest singer in the two songs „Drilled to kill“ and „Devil´s Daughter“ (2021)
’’Universal’’. Scheepers as a guest singer in the song „Wrecking Ball“ (2022)

Guest appearances
Scanner - Hypertrace (1988)
German Rock Project - Let Love Conquer the World (1991)
Sinner - No More Alibis (1992)
Brainstorm – Hungry (1997)
Roland Grapow - The Four Seasons of Life (1997)
Scanner - Ball of the Damned (1997)
Pink Cream 69 - Electrified (1998)
Therion - Vovin (1998)
Sinner - The Nature of Evil (1998)
Therion - Crowning of Atlantis (1999)
Ayreon - Universal Migrator Part 2: Flight of the Migrator (2000)
VA - Catch The Rainbow : A Tribute to Rainbow (2000)
VA - German Rock Stars - Wings of Freedom (2001)
Sinner - There Will Be Execution (2003)
Tribuzy - Execution (2005)
Sinner - Mask of the Sanity (2007)
Tribuzy - Execution Live Reunion (2007)
Solna - Sent from Heaven (EP) (2008)
Shadow Gallery - Digital Ghosts (2009)
Solna - Eurameric (2009)
Phenomena - Blind Faith (2010)
Dragony - Legends (2011)
Helker - Somewhere in the Circle (2013)
Highlord - The Warning After (2013)
Nergard - Memorial for a Wish (2013)
Rage of Angels - Dreamworld (2013)
Magnus Karlsson - Free Fall (2013)
Pamela Moore - Resurrect Me (2013)
Domination - Doom in Nation (2013)
Mägo de Oz - The Black Book (2013)
Hellcircles - Prelude to Decline (2014)
Desert - Never Regret (2015)
Gaelbah - Häxan (2015)
Graveshadow - Blink (2015)
Hansen - XXX : 30 Years Of Metal (2016)
Derdian - Revolution Era (2016)
The Rose of Lilith - Soulless (2017)
Soulspell Metal Opera - The Second Big Bang (2017)
Europica - Part One (2017)
Icy Steel - Guest on Earth (2018)
Constantine - Aftermath (2019)
Hellrazer - Bonecrusher (2019)
Trend Kill Ghosts - Kill Your Ghosts (2019)
Adrian Benegas - The Revenant (2019)
Vanish - Altered Insanity (2020)
Hellbound - Overlords (2020)
Avaland - Theater of Sorcery (2021)
Marius Danielsen - Legend of Valley Doom Part III (2021)
Trick or Treat - The Unlocked Songs (2021)
Powerwolf - Call of the Wild (Deluxe Version) (2021)
Basement Prophecy - Metal Zeit (Daalschlag cover) (2021)
Avantasia - The Wicked Rule the Night (2022)
Xandria - You Will Never Be Our God (2022)

Filmography

As actor
Dreath: Sidestories Underground (Short 2012) - SoldierDevil's Five (2021) - Ansel Schneider

SoundtrackGamma Ray: Skeletons & Majesties Live'' (Video 2012)  (lyrics: "The Spririt", "Brothers") / (writer: "Brothers")

References

1965 births
German heavy metal singers
German male singers
English-language singers from Germany
Therion (band) members
Living people
People from Esslingen am Neckar
Gamma Ray (band) members
Primal Fear (band) members